Basil Spalding de Garmendia (February 28, 1860 – November 9, 1932) was an American tennis player who competed in the 1900 Summer Olympics.

Spalding de Garmendia was born in Baltimore, Maryland to the wealthy family Garmendia, of Spanish ancestry. In 1900 he won a Silver medal in Men's Doubles event with Max Décugis of France. In the singles, he reached the quarter-finals, losing to Laurence Doherty.

References

External links
 
profile

1860 births
1932 deaths
19th-century American people
19th-century male tennis players
American male tennis players
Olympic silver medalists for the United States in tennis
Sportspeople from Baltimore
Tennis people from Maryland
Tennis players at the 1900 Summer Olympics
Medalists at the 1900 Summer Olympics